Hillborough Studios was a short-lived Canadian comic book publisher, founded in 1941, most notable for publishing Adrian Dingle's Nelvana of the Northern Lights.

Overview
In August 1941, Hillborough was founded in Toronto, Ontario, Canada by Adrian Dingle, the brothers René and André Kulbach, and an anonymous investor. Their flagship title was called Triumph-Adventure Comics, and featured the most famous character of what has been called the Golden Age of Canadian comics—Dingle's Nelvana of the Northern Lights, the first Canadian female superhero, who debuted several months before Wonder Woman.

After seven monthly issues, Dingle brought Triumph-Adventure to Bell Features in early 1942, and was followed by most of the Hillborough staff.

References

Further reading
 

Publishing companies established in 1941
Golden Age of Comic Books
Comic book publishing companies of Canada
Publishing companies disestablished in 1942
1941 establishments in Ontario
1942 disestablishments in Ontario